The name Pabuk has been used to name four tropical cyclones in the northwestern Pacific Ocean. The name was submitted by Laos and refers to Mekong giant catfish, found in the Mekong River and its tributaries.
 Typhoon Pabuk (2001) (T0111, 14W) – struck Japan
 Typhoon Pabuk (2007) (T0706, 07W, Chedeng) – struck Taiwan and China
 Severe Tropical Storm Pabuk (2013) (T1320, 19W) – classified as a typhoon by the JTWC
 Tropical Storm Pabuk (2019) (T1901, 36W) – struck the Malay Peninsula

References

Pacific typhoon set index articles